Nadia Petrova was the defending champion, but lost in the first round to Kateryna Bondarenko.

Anna Chakvetadze won the title, defeating Ágnes Szávay in the final 6–3, 2–6, 6–2.

Seeds

Draws

Key
Q - Qualifier
WC - Wild Card

Finals

Section 1

Section 2

External links
 Singles draw

Singles 2008
Open Gaz de France